The Lhasa–Nyingchi railway also known as the Lalin Line, is a single-track railway across the southeast Tibet, China, linking Lhasa and Nyingchi. The trains have been equipped with oxygen supply equipment. There are currently nine stations in the cities of Lhasa, Shannan, and Nyingchi that can handle both passengers and freight transportation.

Construction
The railway crosses the Yarlung Tsangpo River 16 times and has 47 tunnels and 121 bridges. It is part of the under-construction Sichuan–Tibet railway that will connect Lhasa and Chengdu, capital of the neighboring Sichuan province. Lhasa-Nyingchi railway is the first fully-electrified railway in Tibet region. The rolling stock is the China Railway CR200J Fuxing series powered by both electronic motors and internal combustion engines, marking the complete coverage of Fuxing series to all provincial-level regions in China. The newly opened train route provides Nyingchi with access to railway services for the first time in history.

History
On 4 November 2014, the National Development and Reform Commission approved the construction of Lhasa–Nyingchi railway. The Sangzhuling Tunnel started engineering works on 19 December 2014. Construction began on 28 June 2015, and the track-laying work was completed by the end of 2020. 

On 25 June 2021, the railway began operation, with the first train leaving Lhasa for Nyingchi at 10.30 am. Compared with roads, the railway reduces the travel time from Lhasa to Nyingchi from 5 hours to 3.5 hours, and cuts the travel time from Shannan to Nyingchi from 6 hours to more than 2 hours.

Stations

See also
 Sichuan–Tibet railway

References

Railway lines in China
Rail transport in Tibet
Railway lines opened in 2021